Oswald von Nell-Breuning  (8 March 1890 – 21 August 1991) was a Roman Catholic theologian and sociologist.

Born in Trier, Germany into an aristocratic family, Nell-Breuning was ordained in 1921 and appointed Professor of Ethics at the Sankt Georgen Graduate School of Philosophy and Theology in 1928. He was instrumental in the drafting of Pope Pius XI's social encyclical Quadragesimo anno (1931), which – like the earlier Rerum novarum (1891), after which it was named – dealt with the "Social Question" and developed the principle of subsidiarity. Nell-Breuning was not allowed to publish from 1936 to the end of Nazi Germany in 1945. After the war he lectured as an honorary professor at Goethe University at later established his own "Akademie der Arbeit" (Academy of Work). He exerted a strong influence on the social policy program of the Christian Democratic Union of Germany and had a close relationship with the German trade unions. He died in Frankfurt am Main.

References
 Oswald von Nell-Breuning (1890-1991)—Katholischer Sozialethiker, Sozialphilosoph und Sozialwissenschaftler

1890 births
1991 deaths
German centenarians
20th-century German Jesuits
People from Trier
20th-century German Catholic theologians
People from the Rhine Province
German male non-fiction writers
Grand Crosses 1st class of the Order of Merit of the Federal Republic of Germany
Men centenarians